Poison Gas (German: Giftgas) is a 1929 German silent drama film directed by Mikhail Dubson and starring Hans Stüwe, Lissy Arna and Alfred Abel. It is based on the play Poison Gas over Berlin by Peter Martin Lampel.

The film's art direction was by August Rinaldi.

Cast
 Hans Stüwe as Arnold Horn, ein Erfinder  
 Lissy Arna as Ellen  
 Alfred Abel as Direktor Hansen  
 Fritz Kortner as Konzernpräsident Straaten  
 Gerhard Dammann as Arbeiter Pieter  
 Vera Baranovskaya as Pieters Frau  
 Bobby Burns as Pieters Sohn  
 Nico Turoff 
 Paul Rehkopf 
 Carl Goetz

References

Bibliography
 Kreimeier, Klaus. The Ufa Story: A History of Germany's Greatest Film Company, 1918-1945. University of California Press, 1999.

External links

1929 films
Films of the Weimar Republic
Films directed by Mikhail Dubson
German silent feature films
German disaster films
German black-and-white films
German adventure films
1929 adventure films
Silent adventure films
1920s German films
1920s German-language films